Alcomdale is a hamlet in central Alberta, Canada within Sturgeon County. There is a community hall and public playground within the hamlet, no other services.

History 
The community has the name of Dr. Alcombreck, the original owner of the site.

Demographics 

See also 
List of communities in Alberta
List of hamlets in Alberta

References 

Designated places in Alberta
Hamlets in Alberta
Sturgeon County